David D. Schaaf (born February 15, 1939) was an American politician and businessman.

Schaaf was born in Minneapolis, Minnesota. He graduated from Duluth East High School in Duluth, Minnesota and went to St. Cloud State University. Schaaf lived in Fridley, Minnesota and was a florist. He served in the Minnesota Senate from 1973 to 1980 and was a Democrat.

References

1939 births
Living people
Businesspeople from Minnesota
Politicians from Minneapolis
People from Fridley, Minnesota
St. Cloud State University alumni
Florists
Democratic Party Minnesota state senators